Enoch is a surname. Notable people with the surname include:

Alfred Enoch (born 1988), English actor
Craig T. Enoch (born 1950), American lawyer and judge
David Enoch (1901–1949), Israeli chess player
David Enoch (philosopher), Israeli philosopher
Don Enoch (1916–2010), American politician
Leeanne Enoch, Australian politician 
Samuel Enoch (1814–1876), German rabbi
Suzanne Enoch, American writer
Suzy Enoch, Scottish writer and actress
Wesley Enoch (born 1969), Australian playwright